Caught in the Act... Live is the second live album by Australian band, Sherbet. The album was released in October 1977. The album peaked at number 33 on the Kent Music Report.

Track listing

Personnel 
 Bass Guitar – Tony Mitchell 
 Drums – Alan Sandow 
 Guitars – Harvey James 
 Keyboards, Vocals – Garth Porter 
 Lead Vocals – Daryl Braithwaite

Chart positions

Release history

Notes 
 All tracks recorded during Sherbet's Photoplay Australian National Tour May–July 1977

References 

Sherbet (band) albums
1977 live albums
Festival Records live albums
Live albums by Australian artists